Psychostrophia nymphidiaria is a moth in the family Epicopeiidae. It was described by Oberthür in 1893. It is found in western China.

References

Moths described in 1893
Epicopeiidae